Jag måste kyssa dig (I must kiss you) is the fourth studio album by Swedish singer/songwriter Nanne Grönvall, released in March 2007.

Track listing

Charts

Weekly charts

Year-end charts

References

2007 albums
Nanne Grönvall albums